Major General Semyon Alexanderovich Tchernetsky (Russian:Семё́н Алекса́ндрович Черне́цкий) was a Ukrainian-born, Russian and Soviet military conductor. He is credited as the founder of modern Russian military bands. He served as the Senior Director of the Central Military Band of the People's Commissariat of National Defense of the USSR from 1924 to 1950.

Early life and family 
Tchernetsky was born on October 24, 1881 in Odessa to a musical family. He was born Solomon Isaevich Tchernetsky, a Jewish name which he russified in 1917 to Semyon Alexanderovich. His father, Isai Alexandrovich Shtember was a violinist and violin teacher. Hus mother Dora Isaevna Chernetskaya was a piano teacher. His cousin Lev would later become the bandmaster of the 8th Don Cossack Regiment of the 8th Cavalry Division based at Odessa.

Early musical career 
From 1892-1893, Tchernetsky studied the trombone in the orchestra of the 24th Dragoon Lubny Regiment in Kishinev, Bessarabia Governorate (now Chisinau, Moldova), where his uncle Issac was the conductor. In 1900, due to the difficult financial situation of the family, after the death of his father and without graduating from college, he was sent to Kishinev to live with Issac. In Kishinev, he graduated from the music classes of the local branch of the Imperial Russian Musical Society and decided to devote himself to military music. At first he tried his hand as an assistant to his uncle, and in 1903 he himself became bandmaster of the 14th Artillery Brigade (part of the 15th Infantry Division of the Imperial Russian Army). In the same year, during the Kishinev pogrom, he participated in the organization of self-defense, and as a result was seriously wounded and lost his left eye. In 1911 he entered the St. Petersburg Conservatory, which he graduated in 1917.

Leadership of Red Army bands 
In 1918, Chernetsky joined the Red Army and was appointed as the head of the military bands of the Petrograd military district. He quickly rose through the ranks, eventually being appointed as the director of the Military Band of the Workers and Peasants Red Army in 1924. After more than 10 years in this position, he formed the Central Military Band of the People's Commissariat of National Defense, which later became the first military band to be formed in modern Russia. In 1935, together with professor Heinrich Neuhaus at the Moscow Conservatory, he created the Military Faculty of the Moscow State Conservatory, where music students get a curriculum based on the conducting and combat repertoire. On 1 August 1937, Cherneysky founded the Moscow Military Music College as a means of building and enhancing the knowledge of potential military musicians in the Red Army. On June 24, 1945, Tchernetsky led the massed bands during the Moscow Victory Parade of 1945 on Red Square.

Later life 
In 1946, he suffered from a paralysis, which resulted in his retirement from active service after 25 years in the armed forces. Tchernetsky died on April 13, 1950 in Moscow. He is buried at Novodevichy Cemetery.

Legacy
Tchernetsky is highly regarded in the Russian military music sphere and one of the most outstanding Russian military composers in the 20th century. Depending on sources, he wrote between 100-200 marches, patriotic songs and other works in his lifetime. In addition to military marches, he also wrote some socio-political ones such as Glory to the Motherland, Lenin's Call and the March of Moscow Pioneers. Many of his military marches are the most famous and common ones used by the Russian Military Band Service, some of which have been used Moscow Victory Day Parade on Red Square for decades.

Compositions
Marches
Lenin's Call (1924-1936)Industrial March (1932)GTO (1933)Birobidzhan March (1934)Slow March of Military Academies of RKKA (1936)Slow March (1936)Slow March of Red Army (1936)Moscow Pioneers March (1936)Cossack March (1936)Georgian March (1936)Red Banner Komsomol March (1936)Ukrainian March No. 1 (1936)Ukrainian March No. 2 (1936)Ukrainian March No. 3 (1936 or 1938)Georgian Column March (1937)Youth March (1937)Cavalry Trot (1938)Red Banner Ensemble (1937)March "Our Homeland (1938)March "Under the Flag of the People's Commissar" (1938)Friendship of the peoples of the USSR (1939)Parade March (1940)Solemn March (in honor of 20th anniversary of the Russian Cavalry Corps)
Moldavian March (1940)
Bessarabian March (1940)
Anatoly Krokhalev (1940)
Victory Triumph (1940)
Slow March of the Officer Schools (1941)
March of the 1st Rifle Guards Division (1941)
March "Victory is Behind Us" (1941)
Slow March of the First Guards Cavalry Corps (1942)
 Slow March of the Second Guards Cavalry Corps (1942)
Slow March of the Third Guards Cavalry Corps (1942)
March of the 8th Guards Motor Rifle "Panfilov" Division (1942)
Slavic March (1942)
Fanfare March of Guard Divisions (1942)
March of the First Guards Rifle Division (1942)
For a Just Cause (1942)
Hero of Stalingrad (1943)
Hero of Azerbaijan (1943)
Jubilee Slow March "25 Years of the Red Army" (1943)
March of the Tankists (1943)
March of the Guards Mortarmen (1943)
March of the Leningrad Guards Rifle Divisions (1944)
Native Donbass (1944)
March of the 53rd Rifle Guards Division (1944)
Salute to Moscow (1944)
Victory March (fanfare) (1944)
The Red Army's Entry into Bucharest (1944)
The Red Army's Entry into Budapest (1945)
Victory Holiday March (1946)
Russian March (1945)
Slow March of the Artillery March (1946)
Slow March of the Tankists (1946)
March of the Artillery (1946) 
March of Guards Artillery (1946)

Awards 
 Honored Artist of the RSFSR (1936)
 Stalin Prize (1946) 
 Order of Lenin
 Order of the Red Banner
 Order of the Patriotic War 
 Order of the Red Star 
 Medal "20 Years of the Red Army" (1938)

See also 
 Military Band Service of the Armed Forces of Russia

References 

1881 births
1950 deaths
Military music composers
Russian military musicians
Soviet composers
Soviet male composers
Soviet conductors (music)
Soviet major generals
20th-century conductors (music)
20th-century Russian male musicians